The Hiller Ten99 (also known as the Hiller 1099) was an American 1961 experimental helicopter, created by Hiller Aircraft.

Design and development
The helicopter seated six and was similar to other helicopters by Hiller, but featured a larger, box-shaped cabin. It has four doors,  and a set of clamshell doors on its aft side. The aircraft was powered by a Pratt & Whitney Canada PT6, and in July 1961, was the first aircraft to have been powered solely by a PT6 engine. The Ten99 was developed for a United States Navy Assault Support Helicopter program. However, the Navy eventually selected the Bell HU-1 instead. A civilian model was proposed, but not produced, and the project was eventually abandoned.

Specifications

Notes

References

Ten99
1960s United States experimental aircraft
1960s United States helicopters
Aircraft first flown in 1961